The European Union Savings Directive (EUSD), formally Council Directive 2003/48/EC of 3 June 2003 on taxation of savings income in the form of interest payments, was a directive of the European Union enacted to implement the European Union withholding tax, requiring member states to provide other member states with information on interest paid to achieve effective taxation of the payments in the member state where the taxpayer is resident for tax purposes.

It was an anti-tax evasion measure, similar to FATCA. It was repealed on 10 November 2015, in favor of Directive 2014/107/EU.

See also 

 European Union withholding tax
 US Foreign Account Tax Compliance Act

References

External links 

 

European Union directives
2003 in law
2003 in the European Union